Hale Glacier is a glacier about  long, located just east of Mount Simpson on Thurston Island, Antarctica, and flowing southwest to the Abbot Ice Shelf in Peacock Sound. It was delineated from air photos taken by U.S. Navy Squadron VX-6 in January 1960, and was named by the Advisory Committee on Antarctic Names (US-ACAN) for Lieutenant Bill J. Hale, U.S. Navy, a helicopter pilot aboard  who made exploratory flights to Thurston Island in February 1960.

Gould Knoll is a mostly ice-covered rock knoll that rises on the east margin of the glacier, at the point the glacier enters the Abbot Ice Shelf. It was named by US-ACAN after William G. Gould, a National Oceanic and Atmospheric Administration specialist, from the 1960s to the mid-1990s, in the archiving of Advanced Very High Resolution Radiometer (AVHRR) satellite images of the world, including those used for AVHRR image maps of the Antarctic continent.

See also
 List of glaciers in the Antarctic
 Glaciology

Maps
 Thurston Island – Jones Mountains. 1:500000 Antarctica Sketch Map. US Geological Survey, 1967.
 Antarctic Digital Database (ADD). Scale 1:250000 topographic map of Antarctica. Scientific Committee on Antarctic Research (SCAR), 1993–2016.

References

Glaciers of Thurston Island